Altandhu is a small hamlet, overlooking the sea loch, Loch an Alltain Duibh to the west, on the western shore of the Rubha Mor Peninsula, in the Achiltibuie area, in Ullapool, Ross-shire, Scotland, within the Scottish council area of Highland.

Despite its relatively small size, there are a number of interesting local attractions, including the Am Fuaran bar, and Port Beag Chalets. 2011 film The Eagle filmed on location amongst the landscapes surrounding Alandhu, including Achnahaird Bay.

References

See also
List of lochs in Scotland

Populated places in Ross and Cromarty